Champagnac may refer to the following communes in France:

Champagnac, Cantal, in the Cantal département 
Champagnac, Charente-Maritime, in the Charente-Maritime département
Champagnac-de-Belair, in the Dordogne département 
Champagnac-la-Noaille, in the Corrèze département
Champagnac-la-Prune, in the Corrèze département 
Champagnac-la-Rivière, in the Haute-Vienne département
Champagnac-le-Vieux, in the Haute-Loire département